Durga Rangila is a Punjabi singer. ਦੁਰਗਾ ਰੰਗੀਲਾ(दुर्गा रंगीला)
ਬਹੁਤ ਵਧੀਆ ਪੰਜਾਬੀ ਗਾਇਕੀਂ

Discography 
Kali Gani Mitran Di
 Pith Te War
 Kali Gani Mitran Di
 Dil Mere Diyan
 Gut Nachdi Di
 Haye Ni Munda
 Gandasi Khadke
 Tera Nachana
 Luk Luk Rovengi

Na Layo Na Layo
 Heer Ranjha
 Tota Kee Mangda
 Dil Marda Tere Te
 Nibhayian Kiven Jandian
 Kurian Kuwariyan
 Borh Diyan Shaavan
 Kaale Pani Warga
 Na Layo Na Layo

Noor Tere Naina Da
 Mirza
 Pind Pekeyan De
 Ishqe Da Kais
 Khufia Jashan
 Noor Tere Naina Da
 Tainu Vaasta Eh
 Marhi Te Deeva
 Pehli Peengh
  
Sad Songs - Vol : 8 
 Marhi Te Deeve
 Chaale Haale Garian De
 08 Rab Varga Se Tera Yaar
 Tu Vakh Roven
 Luk Luk Rovengi
 Dil Mere Diya Pidan
 Pith Te Jine Waar
 Heer Ranjha
 Nibhaiyan Kiven Jandiyan
 Kale Paani

Ji Ve Sohnia Ji
 Doli Chakio Kaharo
 Behja Sohniye
 Sajna Chad De Pochey Paune
 Nanke Mail Vich Aaye
 Ji Ve Sohnia Ji
 Kudi Majajan Ne
 Phone Karia Karungi

Na Layo Na Layo
 Kaale Pani Warga.
 Kurian Kuwarai
 Tota Ki Mangda
 Nibhaiyan Kiven Jandian
 Dil Marda Tere Te
 Heer Ranjha
 Borh Diyan Shavan
 Na Layo Na Layo
 Heer Ranjha
 Dil Marda Tere Te
 Nibhaiyan Kiven Jandian
 Tota Ki Mangda
 Kurian Kuwarai
 Kaale Pani Warga
 Borh Diyan Shavan
 Na Layo Na Layo

Shaheed Udham Singh (film)
 Song -"Zaat" : Inaugural Song filmed on Amrish Puri & Raj Babbar

Khalsa Aid
 Released in Feb-2015, Rangila featured in song for a Khalsa Aid event along with Punjabi musician Charanjit Ahuja.

References

External links
  Durga Rangila on I-Tunes

Bhangra (music)
People from Punjab, India
Punjabi-language singers
Living people
Year of birth missing (living people)